Thierry Paiva (Born 19 November 1995) is a French rugby union player. His usual position is as a loose-head prop, and he currently plays for Bordeaux Bègles in the Top 14.

In February 2021 he was called into the France Senior Test team for the 2021 Six Nations.

References

External links
 

1995 births
Living people
Sportspeople from Bordeaux
French rugby union players
Union Bordeaux Bègles players
Rugby union props
US Carcassonne players